Kogiopsis is a genus of Middle Miocene cetacean from the family Kogiidae. These teeth are found mostly in Florida and South Carolina. In addition to its teeth, Kogiopsis is known primarily from mandibles. The anatomy of the teeth and lower jaws are similar to those of the extinct sperm whale genus, Orycterocetus.

References

External links
http://www.fossilsonline.com/index.php?main_page=product_info&products_id=415
http://paleodb.org/cgi-bin/bridge.pl?action=basicTaxonInfo&taxon_no=36745
http://www.blackriverfossils.org/Portals/0/Product/ditchweezil/DSC00746.JPG

Miocene cetaceans
Fossil taxa described in 1929
Sperm whales
Prehistoric toothed whales
Prehistoric monotypic mammal genera
Miocene mammals of North America
Taxa named by Remington Kellogg